Wates is the capital of Kulon Progo Regency, in Yogyakarta Special Region on Java, Indonesia. It is located about 25 km to the west of Yogyakarta.

Climate
Wates has a tropical monsoon climate (Am) with moderate to little rainfall from May to September and heavy rainfall from October to April.

Other places in Indonesia
There are numerous other districts and villages in Indonesia named Wates (see Wikipedia Indonesia disambiguation page ).

References

Kulon Progo Regency
Districts of the Special Region of Yogyakarta
Regency seats of the Special Region of Yogyakarta